Pulu Talo Poumele (January 31, 1972 – June 4, 2016) was an American football coach and offensive tackle who played in both the National Football League (NFL) and the Canadian Football League (CFL).

Early and personal life
Born in Oceanside, California, Poumele attended Oceanside High School.

Playing career
Poumele played college football at the University of Arizona, before playing in the NFL with the Cleveland Browns, Baltimore Ravens and San Diego Chargers, and in the CFL with the Toronto Argonauts.

Coaching career
Poumele was the head coach at San Marcos in 2009, the head coach at El Camino for four seasons, and he later worked at Oceanside High School as a special education teacher and the defensive coordinator for the football team.

Personal life
Poumele was married with five children. His cousin was Junior Seau. On June 4, 2016, after playing basketball, Poumele went into cardiac arrest and died at a 24 Hour Fitness in Oceanside.

References

External links

1972 births
2016 deaths
American football offensive linemen
American players of Canadian football
Canadian football offensive linemen
Arizona Wildcats football players
Baltimore Ravens players
San Diego Chargers players
Cleveland Browns players
Toronto Argonauts players
High school football coaches in California
sportspeople from Oceanside, California
Players of American football from California
American sportspeople of Samoan descent
Sports deaths in California